Drymarchon is a genus of large nonvenomous colubrid snakes, commonly known as indigo snakes or cribos, found in the Southeastern United States, Central America, and South America. Reaching  or more in length, they are among the world's largest colubrid snakes.

Description
They have smooth dorsal scales, and several color variations, including a glossy blue-black color. This snake genus, Drymarchon, means "Lord of The Forest". This is a sexually dimorphic species so the males are larger than the females. This is thought to be due to intraspecies competition from the males.

Behavior and diet
Indigo snakes are diurnal and actively forage for prey. They feed on a broad variety of small animals such as rodents, birds, lizards, frogs, toads, and other snakes, including rattlesnakes.
They are not aggressive snakes and will bite only when threatened. Typical threat display includes hissing and shaking of its tail as a warning.

Habitat 
The current distribution of D. couperi is reported as extending from the Coastal Plain of southern Georgia to peninsular Florida and the lower Florida Keys west to Southeastern Mississippi.  They use a variety of different habitats, including longleaf pine-turkey oak sandhills, pine and scrub flatwoods, dry prairie, tropical hardwoods, freshwater wetlands, and coastal dunes; however, winter survival, especially in northern portions of its range, depends on the availability of appropriate shelters which are primarily Gopher Tortoise burrows. These burrows can be used to hide from predators, fires, and extreme temperatures.

Threats 
Populations in Alabama, Texas, and South Carolina have been largely lost due to habitat destruction, poaching, and killings. Indigo snakes are currently protected under the United States Fish and Wildlife Service and the Florida Fish and Wildlife Conservation Commission which makes it illegal to possess, harm, or harass them. Permits are also required in order to keep or transport this species.

Species and subspecies

The genus Drymarchon was formerly considered to be a monotypic taxon formed by subspecies of D. corais. Currently the genus includes six distinct species recognized by ITIS: One of the species has several subspecies which are recognized as being valid.
Indigo snake, yellow-tailed indigo snake — Drymarchon corais 
Falcon indigo snake — Drymarchon caudomaculatus  
Eastern indigo snake — Drymarchon couperi  
Margarita indigo snake — Drymarchon margaritae 
Middle American indigo snake — Drymarchon melanurus 
Black-tailed cribo — Drymarchon melanurus melanurus 
Texas indigo snake — Drymarchon melanurus erebennus 
Orizaba indigo snake — Drymarchon melanurus orizabensis 
Mexican red-tailed indigo snake — Drymarchon melanurus rubidus 
Unicolor cribo — Drymarchon melanurus unicolor 

Nota bene: A binomial authority or a trinomial authority in parentheses indicates that the species or subspecies was originally described in a genus other than Drymarchon.

References

External links

The Indigo Snake Systematics Page: A New Species of Indigo Snake (Drymarchon) from Venezuela, and a Reclassification of the Genus.
"Black Snakes": Identification and Ecology - University of Florida fact sheet.

Colubrids
Reptiles of the United States
Reptiles of Central America
Reptiles of South America
Snake genera
Taxa named by Leopold Fitzinger